All India Shia Organisation (A.I.S.O) is a Hyderabad, India-based organisation working for the welfare of the Shia community and for the protection of Shia wakf properties.

The president, Mir Hadi Ali, has worked for the upliftment and for providing correspondence to the government on various issues of Shias.

Office bearers
 Mir Hadi Ali — Founder and chairman
 Mirza Mehdi Ali Baig — General secretary
 Syed Raza Hussain Zaidi — Secretary
 Syed Rizwan Hussain Zaidi 6— Secretary of operations

See also 
All India Shia Political Conference

References

External links
 Release grants announced to Shia Ashoorkhanas before Muharram - A.I.S.O's representation to Govt.
 Shia's oppose Marriage welfare scheme - A.I.S.O's representation to Govt.
 Mr. Mir Hadi Ali in Elections List - General Elections 1999
 Secular votes divided due to secret pact of BJP & MIM: Sirajuddin
 Congress leaders including Mir Hadi Ali demanded the Congress announce the candidature of TPCC Minorities Department chairman Md Sirajuddin as its candidate for Hyderabad Lok Sabha seat in the next elections

Indian Shia Muslims
India
Shia Islam in India